Monastiraki (Greek: Μοναστηράκι, Monastiráki, literally little monastery) is a flea market neighborhood in the old town of Athens, Greece, and is one of the principal shopping districts in Athens.  The area is home to clothing boutiques, souvenir shops, and specialty stores, and is a major tourist attraction in Athens and Attica for bargain shopping.  The area is named after Monastiraki Square, which in turn is named for the Church of the Pantanassa that is located within the square. The main streets of this area are Pandrossou Street and Adrianou Street.

The Monastiraki Metro Station, located on the square, serves both Line 1 and Line 3 of the Athens Metro.

Gallery

External links

Monastiraki Square in Athens: Informative text in English, attractions, and photos
Photo Album of Monastiraki
Monastiraki Photo Guide

Retail markets in Greece
Tourist attractions in Athens
Shopping districts and streets in Greece
Neighbourhoods in Athens